Yefry Ramírez Alcala (born November 28, 1993) is a Dominican professional baseball pitcher who is a free agent. He has played in Major League Baseball (MLB) for the Baltimore Orioles, Pittsburgh Pirates, and Los Angeles Dodgers, and in the KBO League for the Hanwha Eagles.

Career

Early career
Ramírez signed with the Arizona Diamondbacks as an international free agent in 2011 as an infielder. The Diamondbacks transitioned him into a pitcher. The New York Yankees selected Ramírez in the minor league portion of the Rule 5 Draft in 2015. The Yankees added him to their 40-man roster after the 2016 season. He began the 2017 season with the Trenton Thunder of the Double-A Eastern League.

Baltimore Orioles
On July 31, 2017, the Yankees traded Ramírez to the Orioles, who assigned him to the Bowie Baysox of the Eastern League.

Ramírez started the 2018 season with the Triple-A Norfolk Tides. The Orioles briefly promoted him to the major leagues in April, but he did not appear in a game. He was recalled to the Orioles on June 13, and made his major league debut that day, taking the loss against the Boston Red Sox. He finished appearing in 17 games, 12 starts, posting a record of 1-8 in  innings. He was designated for assignment on May 22, 2019, after the team acquired outfielder Keon Broxton from the New York Mets. Before being designated for assignment, Ramírez appeared in four games in the 2019 season with one start, posting a 6.97 ERA, an 0-2 record, and 11 strikeouts against nine walks.

Pittsburgh Pirates
After being designated for assignment on May 22, 2019 by Baltimore, Ramírez was traded to the Pittsburgh Pirates on May 27, 2019 for a player to be named later or cash considerations. Ramírez was outrighted off the Pirates roster on November 4 and became a free agent.

New York Mets
On January 11, 2020, Ramírez signed a minor league deal with the New York Mets. Ramírez did not play in a game in 2020 due to the cancellation of the minor league season because of the COVID-19 pandemic. Ramírez was released by the Mets organization on September 20, 2020.

Los Angeles Dodgers
On March 25, 2021, Ramírez signed a minor league contract with the Los Angeles Dodgers organization. After beginning the season with the AAA Oklahoma City Dodgers, he was added to the major league roster on August 1. He pitched two scoreless innings in one game for the Dodgers before was designated for assignment on August 4. On August 7, Ramirez cleared waivers and outrighted back to Oklahoma City. In the minors, he was 6–4 with a 5.81 ERA in 25 games (24 starts) for Oklahoma City. He elected minor league free agency following the season on November 7, 2021.

On December 17, 2021, Ramírez re-signed with the Dodgers organization on a minor league contract. He pitched in eight games in Oklahoma City, with seven starts and an ERA of 3.76.

Hanwha Eagles
On June 1, 2022, Ramírez signed with the Hanwha Eagles of the KBO League. He became a free agent after the 2022 season.

See also
Rule 5 draft results

References

External links

1993 births
Living people
People from Santo Domingo
Major League Baseball players from the Dominican Republic
Major League Baseball pitchers
Baltimore Orioles players
Pittsburgh Pirates players
Los Angeles Dodgers players
Dominican Summer League Diamondbacks players
Arizona League Diamondbacks players
Missoula Osprey players
Charleston RiverDogs players
Tampa Yankees players
Trenton Thunder players
Bowie Baysox players
Toros del Este players
Norfolk Tides players
Indianapolis Indians players
Oklahoma City Dodgers players